Peaceful Places is a heritage tourism trail, launched in 2014. The trail encompasses churches and chapels across the north of the Ceredigion county of Wales, each with its own story. There are 17 places to visit which can be found at Cardigan Bay, and in the valleys and hills of the Cambrian Mountains. The heritage contained within the places of worship span from pre-Christian to modern times.

The trail spans 17 destinations set in stunning landscapes, from the coast to the uplands, taking visitors on a journey to discover wildlife and natural beauty, family history and human events and achievements. The trail offers short walking routes  and also points visitors to examples of fine architecture, art and craftsmanship. The initial concept of the trail came from Roger Haggar, the church warden at Saint Michael's Church, who wanted to raise the profile of the churches and chapels in the area.

Peaceful Places was designed to drive tourism in Wales in response to the faith tourism action plan – the Welsh government aim to make faith tourism more a part of the visitor experience. Edwina Hart, the Economy Minister, said that religious places need to become an “integral part” of the visitor experience by 2020. John Watson encourages the uses of churches and chapels for tourism, commenting “If you're going to tell the story of Wales, you cannot tell it without religion”. The trail is designed to encourage visitors to see the sacred places from a different perspective; as places to spend quality time in a peaceful setting.
 Peaceful Places was officially launched on 7 June 2014.

The places

Gallery

Development
Peaceful Places was created by the North Ceredigion Churches Heritage Trail project, supported by Cadw’s Heritage Tourism Project with investment from the European Regional Development Fund (ERDF). It is managed by Treftadaeth Llandre Heritage, a community group interested in natural and cultural heritage that involves local people. The trail is supported by Churches Tourism Network Wales. The interpretive outputs of the project, such as displays, publications and the trail website, were developed by consultants Countryscape and Creu-Ad.

The Peaceful Places heritage trail was launched on 7 June 2014 at St Michael’s church, Llandre. It was attended by Edwina Hart, the Minister for Tourism.

References

External links
Peaceful Places
Countryscape
Creu-ad Heritage Interpretation

Urban heritage trails